Jean Victor Edmond Paul Marie Bony (born in Le Mans, France, 1 November 1908 – died in Brisbane, Australia, 7 July 1995) was a French medieval architectural historian specialising in Gothic architecture. He was Slade Professor of Fine Art at the University of Cambridge from 1958 to 1961, Fellow of St John's College, Cambridge, and Professor of Art at the University of California at Berkeley, from 1962 to 1980.

Early life and education 
His parents were Henri Bony and Marie Normand Bony. He attended the Lycée Louis-le-Grand, Paris, before going to the University of the Sorbonne, in 1929, where he studied under Henri Focillon, receiving his first degree in History and Geography in 1933. In 1935 he changed his focus to art history under Focillon's influence, and received a two-year fellowship from the Sorbonne to carry out research. He began to travel throughout Europe, in particular in England, in order to write his doctoral thesis on the role of Norman architecture on gothic architecture. He found favourable ground for his research and spent all of his career in English-speaking countries.

Professional work 
Bony taught French as an Assistant Master at Eton College from 1937 to 1939. On the outbreak of the Second World War he returned to France and served in the French Army; he was captured, and spent from 1940 to 1943 in prisoner-of-war camps, where he continued his interest in medieval architecture, writing articles, compiling notes, making detailed drawings, and giving educational talks to his fellow-prisoners. He left the French Army as a first lieutenant in 1944. Returning to the UK after the war, he taught briefly at Eton again (1945 to 1946), then became a Reader at the French Institute in London (1946-1961). In parallel with this he was a Visiting Lecturer (1948-1958) and external examiner (1950-1958) at the Courtauld Institute of Art, University of London. With George Zarnecki of the Courtauld he began a project in around 1960 to compile an exhaustive inventory of Romanesque sculpture in the British Isles, which Zarnecki eventually completed after Bony's death. No doubt through Zarnecki's influence, Bony contributed photographs to the Courtauld Institute's Conway Library, an extensive archive of architectural images currently undergoing a digitisation process. Bony has had a great influence on medieval scholarship within The Courtauld Institute, well beyond his time spent there, and still evident in the work of recent and current Courtauld scholars.

He was Slade Professor of Fine Art at the University of Cambridge from 1958 to 1961). In the USA he was Focillon Fellow and visiting Lecturer at Yale University in 1949, and in 1962 he obtained a chair in the History of Art at the University of California at Berkeley, spending a great deal of his time building the department's collection of slides and photographs. He retired from Berkeley in 1980.

In France he lectured briefly in the History of Art at the University of Lille (1961-1962), and in 1978 he was Visiting Fellow at the Humanities Research Centre of the Australian National University in Canberra.

After his retirement he held the following positions:

 1982: Kress Professorship at the Center for Advanced Study in the Visual Arts at the National Gallery of Art
 1983: Visiting Mellon Professor at the University of Pittsburgh
 1984-1987: Meadows Professor at Southern Methodist University
 1988: Getty Lecturer at the University of Southern California

A member of the formalist tradition, Bony was the first historian to rigorously describe the structure of the “thick hollow wall”, the starting point of a general history of the constitution of the Gothic style in architecture where Norman works play a key role.

Awards and recognitions 

 Honorary MA from Cambridge in 1958
 Elected a Fellow of St John's College
 Guggenheim Fellowship in 1981
 Winner of the Haskins Gold Medal of the Medieval Academy of America, linked to the publication of his book, The English Decorated Style (1979)
 Awarded the gold medal of the Commonwealth Club of San Francisco in 1984, linked to the publication of his book French Gothic Architecture of the 12th and 13th Centuries (1983)
 Elected Honorary Fellow of the Society of Antiquaries of London
 Corresponding Fellow of the British Academy
 Vice-President of the Royal Archaeological Institute (Great Britain), 1955-1961
 Received a Distinguished Teaching Award in 1975
 First recipient of the Constantine Panunzio Distinguished Emeriti Award of the University of California in 1983

Memberships 
Bony was a member of the following professional societies:

 Société Française d'Archéologie 
 Société Nationale des Antiquaires de France
 British Archaeological Association
 College Art Association
 Society of Architectural Historians

Selected publications
La technique normande du mur épais à l’époque romane, Paris: Société Française d’Archéologie, 1939.
Notre-Dame de Mantes, Paris: Editions du Cerf, 1947.
French influences on the origins of English Gothic architecture, Worcester, London: Trinity Press, 1949.
French Cathedrals (with Martin Hurlimann and Peter Meyer), London: Thames and Hudson, 1951.
(Edited and with an Introduction by Jean Bony), Henri Focillon, The Art of the West in the Middle Ages, Volumes 1 and 2, London: Phaidon Press, 1963.
The English decorated style: Gothic architecture transformed, 1250-1350. Oxford: Phaidon Press, 1979.
French Gothic architecture of the 12th and 13th centuries. University of California Press, Berkeley, 1983.

Family 
Bony married Clotilde Roure in 1936, and they had a daughter, Claire. Clotilde died in 1942. He married Elizabeth Mary England, an Australian, in Kensington, SW London, in 1953.

References 

1908 births
1995 deaths
People from Le Mans
French art historians
Fellows of St John's College, Cambridge
French Army officers
University of California, Berkeley College of Letters and Science faculty
French architectural historians
Sorbonne University
People associated with the Courtauld Institute of Art
Slade Professors of Fine Art (University of Cambridge)
Teachers at Eton College
Institut Français
Yale University faculty
Academic staff of the Australian National University
Corresponding Fellows of the British Academy